Gnarl may refer to:

 A rough, knotty protuberance, especially on a tree:
 Gall, any abnormal outgrowth of plant tissues,
 Burl, hard rounded outgrowth on a tree trunk. 
 GNARL or Gnu Ada Runtime Library, a library for the Ada programming language
 Gnarl (Alien Racers), a character in the 2005 animated program Alien Racers 
 Gnarl, a character in the 2007 video game Overlord
 Gnarl!, a 2000 short story collection by Rudy Rucker

See also 

 Knurl (band), a noise music project of Alan Bloor